William P. Foster was an American jurist from Virginia.

Foster was appointed to the Illinois Supreme Court on October 9, 1818, by the Illinois State Legislature with no previous experience as a lawyer. Foster never met with the Supreme Court, and never presided over his assigned circuit court. He resigned on July 7, 1819, before the Supreme Court's first December session.

References

Bibliography

Justices of the Illinois Supreme Court
Year of birth missing
Year of death missing